Hypsirhynchus scalaris, the Tiburon hog-nosed racer, is a species of snake in the family Colubridae.  The species is native to Haiti and the Dominican Republic.

References

Hypsirhynchus
Reptiles of Haiti
Reptiles of the Dominican Republic
Taxa named by Edward Drinker Cope
Reptiles described in 1862